No. 2 Squadron RSAF is a squadron of the Royal Saudi Air Force that operates the McDonnell Douglas F-15C Eagle at King Faisal Air Base (Tabuk).

It used to fly the English Electric Lightning at Tabuk, up until at least 1985.

References

03